The year 1946 in television involved some significant events.
Below is a list of television-related events during 1946. The number of television programming was increasing after World War II.



Events
February 4 – RCA demonstrates an all-electronic color television system.
February 18 – The first Washington, D.C. – New York City telecast through AT&T corporation's coaxial cable, in which General Dwight Eisenhower places a wreath at the base of the statue in the Lincoln Memorial and others make brief speeches, is termed a success by engineers, although Time magazine calls it "as blurred as an early Chaplin movie."
February 25 – The prewar U.S. 18-channel VHF allocation is officially ended in favor of a new 13-channel VHF allocation due to the appropriation of some frequencies by the military and the relocation of FM radio. Only five of the old channels are the same as new channels in terms of frequency and none have the same number as before.
April 22 – CBS transmits a Technicolor movie short and color slides by coaxial cable from Manhattan to Washington (332 kilometers) and return.
June 7 – The BBC Television Service begins broadcasting again for the first time since 1939. The first words heard are "Good afternoon everybody. How are you? Do you remember me, Jasmine Bligh?". Twenty minutes later, the Mickey Mouse cartoon Mickey's Gala Premiere, last programme transmitted seven years earlier at the start of World War II, is reshown.
June 19 – The first televised heavyweight boxing title fight between Joe Louis and Billy Conn is broadcast from Yankee Stadium. The fight is seen by 141,000 people, the largest television audience to see a boxing match to this date.
July 7 – Broadcasting of the BBC's children's programme For The Children is resumed, one of the few pre-war programmes to resume after reintroduction of the service.
August 4 – Children's puppet "Muffin the Mule" debuts in an episode of the series For the Children. He is so popular he is given his own show later that same year.
September 6 – Chicago's WBKB-TV (now WBBM-TV) commences broadcasting as the first U.S. television station outside the Eastern Time Zone.
September 15  – DuMont Television Network begins broadcasting regularly in the United States.
October 2 – The first television network soap opera, Faraway Hill, is broadcast by DuMont.
October 22 – Telecrime, the first television crime series from the 1930s, is resumed by the BBC, retitled Telecrimes.
December 24 – The first Christmas church service is telecast, Grace Episcopal Church in New York, on WABD.
Tokyo Tsushin Kogyo founds a company, which would later become Sony.
Zoomar introduces the first professional zoom lens for television cameras.
 The first postwar television sets are released by the companies RCA, DuMont, Crosley, and Belmont.

Debuts 
 January 4 - You Be the Judge premieres on CBS
 May 9 – The first regularly scheduled American variety show, Hour Glass, premieres on NBC (1946–1947).
 May 23 - Let's Play Reporter premieres on WABD-TV, but produced by ABC
 June 9 - Face to Face premieres on NBC (1946–1947). 
 June 9 - Geographically Speaking premieres on NBC (1946-1947)
 June 20 - Cash and Carry premieres on the DuMont network (1946–1947).
 August 30 - I Love to Eat premieres on NBC (1946–1947).
 September 24 – Play the Game (1946), a US game show.
 October 2 - Faraway Hill, the first network-televised soap opera, debuts on DuMont.
 November 2 – Kaleidoscope (UK) (1946–1953).
 November 15 - Let's Rhumba premieres on NBC (1946–1947).
 November 17 - Television Screen Magazine premieres on NBC (1946–1949).
 November 29 – Pinwright's Progress (UK), British television's first situation comedy, debuts on the BBC Television Service (1946–1947).
 December 27 - Campus Hoopla premieres (1946–1947).
 Boxing From St. Nicholas Arena (1946-1948)
 See What You Know (1946-1949)
You Are an Artist premieres on NBC (1946–1950).
 Gillette Cavalcade of Sports (1946–1960).
Paging You premieres (1946–1948).
Muffin the Mule (UK) premieres (1946–1955).

Television shows

UK

USA

Programs ending

Births 
 January 5 – Diane Keaton, actress
 January 19 – Dolly Parton, country singer and actress
 January 20 – David Lynch, director and actor, Twin Peaks
 January 24 – Michael Ontkean, Canadian actor, The Rookies, Twin Peaks
 January 28 – Don Reo, producer
 February 1
Elisabeth Sladen, English actress, Doctor Who (died 2011)
Bart Braverman, actor, Vega$
 February 2 – Blake Clark, actor, Home Improvement, Boy Meets World
 February 7 – Pete Postlethwaite, English actor (died 2011)
 February 8 – Alex Diakun, actor
 February 13 – Joe Estevez, actor
 February 17 – Lynne Moody, actress, Roots
 February 20
Brenda Blethyn, English actress, Vera
Sandy Duncan, actress, The Hogan Family
 February 21
Tyne Daly, actress, Cagney & Lacey
Alan Rickman, English actor (died 2016)
 March 5 – Michael Warren, actor, Hill Street Blues
 March 6 – Martin Kove, actor, Cagney & Lacey
 March 12
 Frank Welker, voice actor
 Liza Minnelli, actress
 March 15 – Howard E. Scott, singer
 March 17 – Harold Ray Brown, singer
 March 21 – Timothy Dalton, Welsh actor, Penny Dreadful
 March 26 – Johnny Crawford, actor, The Rifleman (died 2020)
 April 5 – Jane Asher, English actress
 April 8 – Tim Thomerson, actor and comedian
 April 10 – David Angell, screenwriter and television producer (died 2001)
 April 12 – Ed O'Neill, actor, Married... with Children, Modern Family
 April 19 – Tim Curry, English actor and singer, It, The Wild Thornberrys
 April 23 – Blair Brown, actress (The Days and Nights of Molly Dodd, Fringe)
 April 24 – Phil Robertson, American professional hunter
 May 1 – Joanna Lumley, English actress, Absolutely Fabulous
 May 3 – Greg Gumbel, TV sportscaster
 May 7 – Michael Rosen, English TV presenter
 May 9 – Candice Bergen, actress, Murphy Brown, Boston Legal
 May 19 – André the Giant, professional wrestler (died 1993)
 May 20 – Cher, singer and actress, The Sonny & Cher Comedy Hour
 May 28 – Gladys Knight, singer
 May 31 – Maeve Kinkead, soap opera actress
 June 1 – Brian Cox, actor
 June 14 – Donald Trump, TV host and former president of the United States
 June 19 – Jennifer Darling, actress, The Six Million Dollar Man, The Bionic Woman
 June 20 – Bob Vila, TV host
 June 23 – Ted Shackelford, actor, Knots Landing
 June 28 
Gilda Radner, actress and comedian, Saturday Night Live (died 1989)
Bruce Davison, actor
 July 6
Fred Dryer, actor, Hunter
Sylvester Stallone, actor
 July 7 – Joe Spano, actor, Hill Street Blues, NCIS
 July 9 
Arthur Albert, actor
Mary-Ellis Bunim, producer (died 2004)
 July 13 – Cheech Marin, actor and comedian, Nash Bridges
 July 14 – Vincent Pastore, actor, The Sopranos
 July 21 – Mel Damski, director
 July 22 – Danny Glover, actor and director
 July 28 – Linda Kelsey, actress, Lou Grant
 August 5 – Erika Slezak, actress, One Life to Live
 August 10 – James Reynolds, actor, Days of Our Lives
 August 14
Antonio Fargas, actor, Starsky & Hutch
Susan Saint James, actress, McMillan and Wife, Kate & Allie
David Schramm, actor, Wings (died 2020)
 August 16 – Lesley Ann Warren, actress and singer, Mission: Impossible
 August 20 – Connie Chung, journalist
 August 26 – Mark Snow, composer
 August 30 – Peggy Lipton, actress, The Mod Squad, Twin Peaks (died 2019)
 September 5 – Mavis Leno, philanthropist
 September 6 – Loudon Wainwright III, actor
 September 25 – Felicity Kendal, English actress, Rosemary and Thyme
 September 24 – David Anspaugh, director
 September 28 – Jeffrey Jones, actor, Deadwood
 September 29 – Patricia Hodge, English actress, Miranda
 October 4 – Susan Sarandon, actress
 October 8 – Lynne Adams, actress
 October 10
Chris Tarrant, English broadcaster
Ben Vereen, actor
 October 11 – Bob Warman, presenter
 October 13 – Demond Wilson, actor, Sanford and Son
 October 14 – Katy Manning, English actress
 October 15 – John Getz, actor
 October 16 
Suzanne Somers, actress, Three's Company, Step by Step
David Greenwalt, screenwriter
 October 18 – Howard Shore, Canadian composer
 October 26 – Pat Sajak, game show host, Wheel of Fortune
 October 27 – Ivan Reitman, screenwriter (died 2022)
 October 31 – Stephen Rea, Irish actor
 November 2 – Richard Newman, Voice actor
 November 4 – Les Lannom, actor, musician, Harry O
 November 6
Sally Field, actress, Gidget, The Flying Nun, Brothers & Sisters
Fred Penner, actor and musician, Fred Penner's Place
 November 20 – Judy Woodruff, broadcast journalist
 November 25 – Marc Brown, author and creator of Arthur
 November 28 – Joe Dante, actor
 December 1 – Jonathan Katz, actor
 December 14 
Patty Duke, actress, The Patty Duke Show (died 2016)
Lynne Marie Stewart, actress
 December 16 – Terence Knox, actor, St. Elsewhere, Tour of Duty
 December 17 – Eugene Levy, actor
 December 18 – Steven Spielberg, American director
 December 19 – Robert Urich, actor, Vega$, Spenser for Hire (died 2002)
 December 20 – Dick Wolf, television producer
 December 23 – Susan Lucci, actress, All My Children

Deaths
June 14 – John Logie Baird, engineer, one of the inventors of the mechanical television, 57
 December 25 – W. C. Fields, US actor and comedian, 66

References